The  is a railway line in the Tōkai region of Japan operated by the Central Japan Railway Company (JR Central). It connects Fuji Station in Fuji, Shizuoka to Kōfu Station in Kōfu, Yamanashi, and the Tōkaidō Main Line with the Chūō Main Line trunk railroads.

History

The  opened a line from Suzukawa (present ) on the Tōkaidō Main Line to Ōmiya (present Fujinomiya) (the southern end of the current route) in 1890.

In 1938 the Minobu line was leased by the government, and nationalized in 1941. The alignment at Fuji was changed in 1968 to allow through trains to operate from Tokyo without requiring a reversal of direction, and the Fuji - Fujinomiya section was double-tracked between 1969 and 1974.

CTC signalling was commissioned in 1982, and freight services ceased in 1987, the year that Central Japan Railway Company (JR Central) took over operations of the Minobu Line following privatization of the Japanese National Railways.

Former connecting lines
 Fujinomiya station - The Fuji Horse Tramway operated a 20 km 610mm gauge line to Kami-ide between 1909 and 1939.

Operation
The Fujikawa limited express service operates between Kōfu and  via Fuji using JR Central 373 series EMU trains. Other trains are all-stations "Local" services, with higher frequencies on the Fuji - Nishi-Fujinomiya and  - Kōfu sections compared to the section in between. 313 series and 211 series EMUs are used on local services.

Stations 
Stations marked with "｜" only local services stop. Stations marked with "●" local and Fujikawa limited express services stop.

See also
 List of railway lines in Japan

References

External links

 Minobu Line Station information

 
Rail transport in Shizuoka Prefecture
Rail transport in Yamanashi Prefecture
Railway lines opened in 1890
1067 mm gauge railways in Japan